Chak 667/8 GB (Urdu: چک ۶۶۷/۸ گ ب) is a small village of Pir Mahal City, Tehsil is Pir Mahal and District is Toba Take Singh in the Punjab Province of Pakistan. This village is fully WiFi zone. People can enjoy high speed WiFi internet all over the village. It is located at 30°44'55N 72°27'44E with an altitude of 100 meters (200 feet).

References

External links
 http://www.cyv.org.pk
 Google Map Chak 667/8 GB, Pir Mahal, Toba Take Singh, Punjab, Pakistan

Populated places in Toba Tek Singh District